is a 1957 Japanese tokusatsu fantasy drama film directed by Bin Kato. Produced and distributed by Daiei Film, it is the second in the Suzunosuke Akado franchise. The film was followed by Suzunosuke Akado: Defeat the Demon-Faced Gang, released in the same year on August 13.

Plot 
In his youth, Suzunosuke Akado (Shoji Umewaka) faces off against his best friend who has joined a gang of criminals.

Cast 

 Shoji Umewaka as Akado Suzunosuke
 Tamao Nakamura as Shinobu
 Yatarō Kurokawa as Shusaku Chiba
 Setsuko Hama
 Narutoshi Hayashi

Release 
Suzunosuke Akado: The Moonlight Monster was released in Japan on June 18, 1957.

The film was released on DVD by Victor Film on December 20, 2002.

References

External links 

 
 

1957 films
1950s fantasy films
Daiei Film films
Films directed by Bin Kato
Daiei Film tokusatsu films
Japanese black-and-white films
Tokusatsu films
1950s Japanese films